Dread Delusion is a video game under development by independent developer Lovely Hellplace and released for early access by DreadXP in June 2022. Described as an "open world" role-playing game brimming with strange places and dark perils," Dread Delusion encourages player exploration and discovery over the use of combat and grinding.

Plot 

Dread Delusion takes place in a series of floating islands, known as the Oneiric Isles, centuries after an apocalypse has made the surface uninhabitable. These lands are ruled by the Apostatic Union, which has taken repressive measures to seize control, including the ban of worship. The player awakes as a prisoner of the Apostatic Union and is offered freedom in exchange for the task of hunting the leader of the outlaw Dark Star Mercenaries, Vela Callose. In the course of their pursuit, the player receives the patronage of a forsaken god and becomes embroiled in a struggle with ramifications for all of the Oneiric Isles.

Gameplay 

Dread Delusion is a role-playing game that is played in first-person perspective across an open world. 
The game features a character system that provides players with opportunities to resolve quests outside of combat, under four attributes (Might, Guile, Wisdom, and Persona) which govern eight skills (Attack, Defence, Lockpick, Agility, Lore, Spellcast, Charm and Barter). The player increases attributes through the collection of Delusions, which are skulls found throughout the world and collected through exploration or completion of certain quests. Combat is straightforward and used by swinging weapons at enemies using the mouse. The player can also interact with the world in several ways using skills, such as using lockpicks to open doors, charm characters to open up dialog options, or use lore to possess the knowledge to interact with items. Weapons, spells and quick-use items are managed in the inventory, where the player can also acquire or buy gear that improves their attack and defence skills.

Development 

Lovely Hellplace is a studio established in 2018 by Brighton-based independent developer James Wragg. Wragg began development of Dread Delusion in 2019 as a desire to merge the role-playing game and walking simulator genres, from an observation that modern role-playing games were "unnecessarily burdened by repetitive combat". An initial version of Dread Delusion was submitted to the compilation Haunted PS1 Demo Disc, published by Breogán Hackett on 6 February 2020. An early access version of the game was released onto Steam on 16 June 2022, following the involvement of independent publisher DreadXP in the development of the game. Whilst initially planning to distribute the game as full release, Wragg stated he was "won over to the idea to the idea of early access" following recognition of the "different level of feedback when you release a game to passionate fans".

Reception 

Reception of the early access version of Dread Delusion was positive, with critics praising the game's atmosphere and worldbuilding. Renata Price of Vice praised the game's "brilliantly released and haunting setting, one that I spend my hours outside the game thinking about", citing the "beautiful and terrible" scenery. Willa Rowe of Inverse praised the "sense of scale" of the game, stating "the game offers such deep worldbuilding that I felt compelled to turn over every rock and find every secret available to me," observing the game "devotes so much attention to compelling stories" that were "satisfying" and part of a "deeper experience". Alice O'Connor of Rock Paper Shotgun stated the game established "a hell of a mood" and "a great vibe." Several outlets raised favorable comparisons between the game and early 3D role-playing games, particuarly the 2002 Bethesda Softworks game The Elder Scrolls III: Morrowind.

Some critics raised critiques of the early access build of the game. Ted Litchfield of PC Gamer noted the system was "a bit too old school", noting that "staying on your feet too long introduces attribute penalties" that "drain very quickly", and noting the limited options to recover fatigue. Courtney Ehrenhofler of TechRaptor noted that understanding the game's mechanics were a "process of trial and error...which can get frustrating at times", noting "I found myself consulting the controls menu more times than I would like, as well as being utterly baffled by weapon upgrades." Writing for GamesHub, David Wildgoose stated the game was equally compelling and bewildering, noting that "throughout the surreal landscape were many locations and incidents that left me puzzled, but intrigued and keen to discover more", observing that I'm rarely sure whether its mysteriousness is the result of deliberate design or that some bits just aren't done yet."

References

External links  
 

Upcoming video games
Indie video games
Early access video games
Video games developed in the United Kingdom
Windows games
Single-player video games